Deutsche Schule Prag (DSP) is a school in Jinonice, District 5, Prague, Czech Republic . It includes levels kindergarten, grundschule (primary school), and gymnasium (secondary school). It was established in 1989 as an initial bilateral project between East Germany and Czechoslovakia.

See also
 Germans in the Czech Republic
 Czech Republic–Germany relations
 Prager Zeitung

References

External links

  Deutsche Schule Prag
  Deutsche Schule Prag

German diaspora in the Czech Republic
Schools in Prague
Prague
International schools in the Czech Republic
Czechoslovakia–East Germany relations
1989 establishments in Czechoslovakia
Educational institutions established in 1989